Karl Theodor Helfferich (22 July 1872 – 23 April 1924) was a German politician, economist, and financier from Neustadt an der Weinstraße in the Palatinate.

Biography
Helfferich studied law and political science at the universities of Munich, Berlin, and Strasbourg. He taught at the University of Berlin and later at the government school for colonial politics and oriental languages. In 1902 he entered upon a diplomatic career. He soon became a leader in the German government's policy of economic imperialism, and in 1906 he was appointed director of the Anatolian Railway which was financed by Deutsche Bank. In 1908 he was made chairman of the directorship of the powerful Deutsche Bank in Berlin.

At the close of the Balkan War, Helfferich was the German financial delegate to the international conference (1913). He was the secretary for the Treasury from 1916 to 1917, and was said to be responsible for financing expenses for World War I through loans instead of taxes. He counted upon a final German victory and upon imposing heavy indemnities upon the Allies. He also served as the vice-chancellor for Chancellors Georg Michaelis and Georg von Hertling.

During the November Revolution, Helfferich became an early supporter of the self proclaimed "national socialist" Eduard Stadtler and helped fund the founding of his Anti-Bolshevist League on December 1, 1918, receiving a cash donation of 5,000 marks from Paul Mankiewitz, the director of Deutsche Bank. This was the nucleus of the 500-million-mark Anti-Bolshevik Fund established by German industry on January 10, 1919 in Berlin. Money from this fund flowed into propagandistic anti-Bolshevik, later National Socialist projects, but also to violent groups such as Freikorps, which were intended to crush the socialist movement after the November Revolution. Stadtler, the founder and leader of the Anti-Bolshevist League, according to his own account, arranged for the murder of Rosa Luxemburg and Karl Liebknecht on January 12, 1919, and broke "Gustav Noske's hesitance" about using the military in Berlin days before.  

After the Treaty of Brest-Litovsk, Helfferich was sent to Moscow as the German Ambassador to Russia, succeeding Wilhelm Mirbach, who was assassinated. Elected to the Reichstag of 1920, Helfferich led the conservative and monarchist right, known as the Deutsch-Nationalen, and strongly opposed reparations and the economic fulfillment of the Versailles Treaty. In particular, he directed his denunciations against the democratic Catholic leader Matthias Erzberger, against whom he had a celebrated lawsuit in 1920.
 
Helfferich was a prominent politician of the German National People's Party (DNVP) and gave radical antirepublican speeches against politicians who supported reparations fulfilment. In June 1920 he was selected as spokesman in the Reichstag for the parliamentary committee of inquiry into policies during the war, which he defended.

During the 1923 hyperinflation, Helfferich developed a plan for a new rye currency, indexed to the price (in paper marks) of rye and other agriculture products.  His plan was rejected because of the extreme variability in the price of rye compared to other commodities, but many of his plan elements were incorporated in the successful RentenMark, which began circulation on 15 November 1923. At the end of 1923, when Helfferich applied for the post of Reichbank president, he was rejected in favor of Hjalmar Schacht.

Helfferich was killed in a railway wreck near Bellinzona, Switzerland, on 23 April 1924.

Legacy
His publications comprise chiefly economic and political studies.

Works
 The Reform of German Finance, 1897
 Studies on Money and Banking, 1900
 Money, 1903
 Germany's National Wealth 1888-1913, (Deutschlands Wohlstand, 1888-1913) 1915
 Speeches and Essays from the War, 1917
 Do Away with Erzberger!, Verlag Scherl, Berlin, 1919, letters to the editor, the Berlin newspaper "Tag"
 The World War, (Der Weltkrieg) (3 vols.) published 1919 by Ullstein Berlin

See also
Weimar Republic

References

Further reading
 .
 New International Encyclopedia

External links

 
 

1872 births
1924 deaths
People from Neustadt an der Weinstraße
Finance ministers of Germany
Government ministers of Germany
People of the Weimar Republic
German Protestants
Germany–Soviet Union relations
Ludwig Maximilian University of Munich alumni
University of Strasbourg alumni
Humboldt University of Berlin alumni
Academic staff of the Humboldt University of Berlin
People from the Palatinate (region)
Ambassadors of Germany to Russia
German National People's Party politicians
Vice-Chancellors of Germany
Members of the Reichstag of the Weimar Republic
German male writers
German monarchists
Accidental deaths in Switzerland